Harry M. Jansen Kraemer Jr. (born 1955) is an American business executive, leadership author, and professor; currently the Clinical Professor of Leadership at the Kellogg School of Management at Northwestern University and Executive Partner at Madison Dearborn Partners. Harry Kraemer is the former chairman and chief executive officer of Baxter International Inc.

Career
Kraemer joined Baxter International Inc. in 1982 as director of corporate development. He spent 23 years at Baxter and the last five years (1999–2004) served as a CEO. Also, he was Chairman (2000-2004) and President (1997-2004) of Baxter International Inc.

When Kraemer was leaving Baxter, Donald Jacobs, Dean Emeritus at Kellogg School of Management, asked him to teach at Kellogg.  In 2005 Harry Kraemer started teaching a course called Managerial Leadership at Kellogg School of Management. The structure of the course is created by Kraemer and called "Value-based Leadership." He was named the 2008 Kellogg School Professor of the Year. Harry Kraemer is also the author of the best-selling book "From Values to Action: The Four Principles of Values-Based Leadership" and "Becoming The Best: Build a World-Class Organization Through Values-Based Leadership." Kraemer's value-based leadership has four principles:
self-reflection;
balance;
true self-confidence;
genuine humility.

Personal life
Kraemer is married to Julie Kraemer, since 1980, with five children. They live in Wilmette, Illinois.

References

1955 births
Living people
American business executives
Baxter International people
Kellogg School of Management faculty
Lawrence University alumni